The members of the 5th Manitoba Legislature were elected in the Manitoba general election held in January 1883. The legislature sat from May 17, 1883, to November 11, 1886.

Premier John Norquay formed a majority government. This is believed to be the first Manitoba provincial election where candidates ran for election purely on party lines.

Thomas Greenway was Leader of the Opposition.

Alexander Murray served as speaker for the assembly.

There were four sessions of the 5th Legislature:

James Cox Aikins was Lieutenant Governor of Manitoba.

Members of the Assembly 
The following members were elected to the assembly in 1883:

Notes:

By-elections 
By-elections were held to replace members for various reasons:

Notes:

References 

Terms of the Manitoba Legislature
1883 establishments in Manitoba
1886 disestablishments in Manitoba